Criticism is the construction of a judgement about the negative qualities of someone or something. Criticism can range from impromptu comments to a written detailed response. Criticism falls into several overlapping types including "theoretical, practical, impressionistic, affective, prescriptive, or descriptive".

Criticism may also refer to an expression of disapproval of someone or something. When criticism of this nature is constructive it can make an individual aware of gaps in their understanding and it can provide distinct routes for improvement. Research supports the notion that using feedback and constructive criticism in the learning process is very influential.

Critique vs. criticism: In French, German, or Italian, no distinction is drawn between 'critique' and 'criticism'. The two words both translate as critique, Kritik, and critica, respectively. In the English language, philosopher Gianni Vattimo suggests that criticism is used more frequently to denote literary criticism or art criticism while critique refers to more general and profound writing as Kant's Critique of Pure Reason. Another distinction that is sometimes made is that critique is never personalized nor ad hominem and is presented in a way that encourages rebuttal or expansion of the ideas expressed. Nonetheless, the distinctions are subtle and ambiguous at best. 

The term "brickbat" is sometimes used to mean "an unfavourable criticism, unkind remark or sharp put-down". The term originated in the 17th century, derived from the practice of throwing bricks as projectiles at a person who was disapproved of.

In some contexts, such as literary criticism and art criticism, the word criticism is used as a neutral word that is synonymous with evaluation.

Criticism in academia 

Critical Studies and Critical Theory programs teach the method of critique, also known as “criticism”. Both theory and studies programs often sample new works in addition to the classical texts. UC Berkeley, CUNY, and Northwestern University offer programs in Critical Theory, while a number of other colleges and universities offer programs or sole courses in Critical Studies, Critical Theory, and sub-disciplines. Sub-disciplines include Critical Race Studies, Critical Asian Studies, Critical Black Studies, and Critical Disability Studies. The term “critical” can be found in course titles concerning a variety of topics, as the term refers to a method or approach to course materials.

Some claim “critical” studies have a particular focus in their perspective or opinion, confusing the method of critique with individual critiques. The recent appearance of “critical” studies and theory further compounds the conflation of particular authors with the new method and discipline. Additionally, the method and disciplines are distinguished from analysis or traditional objectivist or hard sciences by their allowances for subjectivity in the perspective of the author.

Criticism of criticism 
Journalist and writer H. L. Mencken argued that "criticism is little more than a branch of homiletics. They judge a work of art, not by its clarity and sincerity, not by the force and charm of its ideas, not by the technical virtuosity of the artist, not by his originality and artistic courage, but simply and solely by his orthodoxy."

See also 

 Critique
 Literary criticism
 Art criticism
 Film criticism
 Theatre criticism
 Criticism of religion
 Criticism of science
 Self-criticism
 Social criticism

References

External links 
 

 
Philosophical methodology
Literary concepts